Victoria Church (Arabic: كنيسة فيكتوريا) is an old Roman church located in the city of Beja. It represents the unique Christian monument that has been so far excavated at Dougga.

Location 
The monument is located in the archeological site of Dougga in the north-west Tunisia. It stands in the northeast of the site, below the Temple of Saturn.

The small hypogeum is located nearby.

History 
It was built between the end of the 4th century or at the start of the 5th century, the Christian community erected the unusually designed little church over a pagan cemetery.

It was classified by the National Heritage Institute as a national monument on the 13th of March 1912.

References 

Roman sites in Tunisia
Churches in Tunisia
Dougga
Article from DouggaPedia project